The following is an incomplete list of association football clubs based in Niger.
For a complete list see :Category:Football clubs in Niger

A
Akokana FC d'Arlit (Arlit)
AS Douanes (Niamey)
AS-FNIS (Niamey)
AS Madaoua
AS NIGELEC (Niamey)
ASFAN (Niamey)
Askia
AS Police (Niamey)
ALhajiya FC (Zinder)
ALmisri (Jabriya)

D
Dan Gourmou FC (Tahoua)
Dan Kassawa FC (Maradi)

E
Entente FC
Espoir FC (Niger)

J
Jangorzo FC
JS du Ténéré

M
Malbaza FC

O
Olympic FC de Niamey

S
Sahel SC

Z
Zumunta AC

 
Niger
Football clubs